A straight-seven engine or inline-seven engine is a straight engine with seven cylinders.  It is more common in marine applications because these engines are usually based on a modular design, with individual heads per cylinder.

Marine engines
Straight-seven engines produced for marine usage include:
 Wärtsilä-Sulzer RTA96-C two-stroke crosshead diesel engine
 Wärtsilä 32 trunk piston engines
 MAN Diesel IMO two-stroke crosshead diesel engine 
 Burmeister & Wain 722VU37 two-stroke diesel engine (commenced 1937, used in the Danish Havmanden-class submarines
 Sulzer 7QD42 diesel engine (1939-1940, used in the Dutch O 21-class submarines).

Land use
The AGCO Sisu is a straight-seven diesel engine that was released in 2008. Intended for farming machinery, the engine shares various components with the company's straight-six engine.

References

Straight-07
Seven-cylinder engines
Straight-07